The men's 3000 metres steeplechase event at the 2003 Asian Athletics Championships was held in Manila, Philippines on September 21.

Results

References

2003 Asian Athletics Championships
Steeplechase at the Asian Athletics Championships